Jalpa is a village development committee in Palpa District in the Lumbini Zone of southern Nepal. During the 1991 Nepal census it had a population of 3115 people living in 514 individual households.

References

Populated places in Palpa District